Melody of Love is a 1928 American romantic drama film produced and distributed by Universal Pictures, directed by Arch Heath, which starred Walter Pidgeon and Mildred Harris, each their first sound film.

Historically significant as Universal's first 100% all-talkie, the production suffered from having a tight shooting schedule. Carl Laemmle was only able to rent the Fox Movietone sound-on-film recording system for one week, having to be filmed at night while the Fox Studio was closed down for the evenings.

Plot 
When World War I breaks out, Jack Clark (Walter Pidgeon), a Tin Pan Alley songwriter in love with chorus girl Flo Thompson (Jane Winton), enlists in the Army with his pal Lefty (Tom Dugan) and is sent to France, where they spend their time plunking out tunes while enemy shells whiz past their head. There, Jack meets Madelon (Mildred Harris), a little French singer who falls madly in love with him. Eventually, a stray bullet hits Jack during combat and loses the use of his right arm, rendering him unable to wield a pencil to write music or play a piano. He is sent home back to the United States, and upon his return, he is jilted by his former sweetheart Flo and when she senses that Jack isn't going to be much of a gravy train, she sends him packing and Jack becomes a derelict. Madelon, in the meantime, crosses the ocean and finds work singing in a cabaret; Jack finds her by chance and, in his excitement at seeing her once again, recovers the use of the arm. As he sits down at the piano to play for Madelon, Jack knows that he has at last found the woman of his dreams, and Jack writes a hit song dedicated to her.

Cast 
Walter Pidgeon as Jack Clark
Mildred Harris as Madelon
Jane Winton as Flo Thompson
Tommy Dugan as Lefty
Jack Richardson as Music publisher
Victor Potel as The Gawk
Flynn O'Malley as The Sergeant

Preservation status 
No full copies of Melody of Love are known to exist, so this film is considered to be lost, although an incomplete print may exist.

References

External links 

1920s American films
1920s English-language films
1928 films
1928 lost films
1928 romantic drama films
American black-and-white films
American romantic drama films
Films directed by Arch Heath
Lost American films
Lost romantic drama films
Universal Pictures films